Naylor Road is an island-platformed Washington Metro station in Hillcrest Heights, Maryland, United States. The station was opened on January 13, 2001, and is operated by the Washington Metropolitan Area Transit Authority (WMATA). Providing service for only the Green Line, the station is located between Naylor Road, Branch Avenue, and Suitland Parkway.

Groundbreaking for the final segment of the Green Line occurred on September 23, 1995, and the station opened on January 13, 2001. The station won an award from the Portland Cement Association for its use of concrete.

Station layout
The station has an elevated island platform southeast of the intersection between Suitland Parkway and Naylor Road. A parking lot is located south of the platform.

References

External links

 The Schumin Web Transit Center: Naylor Road Station
 Station from Google Maps Street View

Stations on the Green Line (Washington Metro)
Washington Metro stations in Maryland
Railway stations in the United States opened in 2001
2001 establishments in Maryland